is a former Japanese football player.

Playing career
Yahata was born in Kashima on May 29, 1980. He joined J1 League club Kashima Antlers from youth team in 1999. However he could not play at all in the match. In 2000, he moved to J2 League club Vegalta Sendai. He played several matches as center back and the club was promoted to J1 from 2002. However he could hardly play in the match until 2003. In 2004, he moved to Mito HollyHock. However he could not play at all in the match. In 2005, he moved to Regional Leagues club Matsumoto Yamaga FC. He played many matches and retired end of 2008 season.

Club statistics

References

External links

awx.jp

1980 births
Living people
Association football people from Ibaraki Prefecture
Japanese footballers
J1 League players
J2 League players
Kashima Antlers players
Vegalta Sendai players
Mito HollyHock players
Matsumoto Yamaga FC players
Association football defenders